HADD may refer to:

 Dembidolo Airport ICAO code
 Hadd, an Islamic concept
 Hyperactive agency detection device
 Hydroxyapatite deposition disease